Tropidosteptes adustus is a species of plant bug in the family Miridae. It is found in North America.

References

Further reading

 

Articles created by Qbugbot
Insects described in 1929
Tropidosteptes
Miridae
Insects of North America